Alessandro Bardelli (1583–1633) was an Italian painter of the Baroque period.

He was born in Uzzano near Pescia. He trained with the cavalier Francesco Currado and worked along Ludovico Cardi.  Painted mainly in Pescia, including a fresco in the bishop's church. He painted a Archangel Raphael and Tobias returning sight to Tobias' father for the church of Santi Stefano e Niccolao in Pescia. He died in Bologna.

References

1583 births
1633 deaths
People from Pescia
16th-century Italian painters
Italian male painters
17th-century Italian painters
Painters from Bologna
Painters from Tuscany
Italian Baroque painters